Callum Louis Chettle (born 28 August 1996) is an English footballer who plays as a midfielder for Basford United.

After leaving Nottingham Forest for Ilkeston at the age of 15, he moved up the divisions to join Nuneaton Town in July 2015, and then Peterborough United in January 2016.

Club career
Chettle spent his youth with Nottingham Forest, before joining Northern Premier League side Ilkeston at the age of 15. He became the youngest player to start a competitive game for the club when he made his debut at the age of 16. He signed with National League North club Nuneaton Town in July 2015. He entered the Football League when he joined Peterborough United for an undisclosed fee in January 2016; he signed a -year contract. He made his League One debut for the "Posh" on 1 March, coming on as an 85-minute substitute for Leonardo Da Silva Lopes in a 3–1 defeat to Bury at Gigg Lane.

On 3 January 2018, Chettle joined National League side AFC Fylde on loan for the remainder of the campaign.

In July 2018, Chettle joined National League North side Alfreton Town on a one-year deal. On 4 January 2019, he was loaned out to Boston United for one month. On 28 March 2019, he was loaned out again, this time to Matlock Town until the end of the season.

In May 2019, Chettle signed for Northern Premier League Premier Division team Basford United, who were managed by his father Steve Chettle.

International career
Chettle played for the England C team on 1 June 2015, in a 2–1 victory over the Republic of Ireland under-21 side.

Personal life
He is the son of former Nottingham Forest player Steve Chettle, who is also the manager of Basford United.

Career statistics

References

External links
 
 

1996 births
Living people
English footballers
England semi-pro international footballers
Footballers from Nottingham
Association football midfielders
Nottingham Forest F.C. players
Ilkeston F.C. players
Nuneaton Borough F.C. players
Peterborough United F.C. players
AFC Fylde players
Northern Premier League players
National League (English football) players
English Football League players
Alfreton Town F.C. players
Boston United F.C. players
Matlock Town F.C. players
Basford United F.C. players